Fanny Pieroni-Davenport was an Italian painter, active mainly in Florence, mainly of portraits.

Biography
She was a resident of Florence. She exhibited at the Florentine Promotrice of 1889 and 1890. At the Mostra Beatrice di lavori femminili (of feminine works), she won a silver medal for her paintings. Her husband was the painter Antonio Pieroni.

References

19th-century Italian painters
Italian women painters
Painters from Florence
19th-century Italian women artists